Norpropylhexedrine (cyclohexylaminopropane or hexahydroamphetamine) is a stimulant of the cycloalkylamine class and is the hydrogenated analog of amphetamine. It is not approved by any regulatory agency for pharmaceutical use.

Norpropylhexedrine is a metabolite of propylhexedrine.

See also 
 Amphetamine
 Cyclopentamine
 Cypenamine
 Methamphetamine
 Propylhexedrine
 Tranylcypromine

References 

Stimulants
Anorectics
Sympathomimetics
Decongestants
Vasoconstrictors
Norepinephrine-dopamine releasing agents